The arrondissement of Chambéry is an arrondissement of France in the Savoie department in the Auvergne-Rhône-Alpes region. It has 151 communes.

Composition

The communes of the arrondissement of Chambéry, and their INSEE codes, are:
 
 Aiguebelette-le-Lac (73001)
 Aillon-le-Jeune (73004)
 Aillon-le-Vieux (73005)
 Aix-les-Bains (73008)
 Apremont (73017)
 Arbin (73018)
 Arith (73020)
 Arvillard (73021)
 Attignat-Oncin (73022)
 Avressieux (73025)
 Ayn (73027)
 La Balme (73028)
 Barberaz (73029)
 Barby (73030)
 Bassens (73031)
 La Bauche (73033)
 Bellecombe-en-Bauges (73036)
 Belmont-Tramonet (73039)
 Betton-Bettonet (73041)
 Billième (73042)
 La Biolle (73043)
 Bourdeau (73050)
 Le Bourget-du-Lac (73051)
 Bourget-en-Huile (73052)
 Bourgneuf (73053)
 La Bridoire (73058)
 Brison-Saint-Innocent (73059)
 Challes-les-Eaux (73064)
 Chambéry (73065)
 Chamousset (73068)
 Chamoux-sur-Gelon (73069)
 Champ-Laurent (73072)
 Champagneux (73070)
 Chanaz (73073)
 La Chapelle-Blanche (73075)
 La Chapelle-Saint-Martin (73078)
 La Chapelle-du-Mont-du-Chat (73076)
 Châteauneuf (73079)
 Le Châtelard (73081)
 La Chavanne (73082)
 Chignin (73084)
 Chindrieux (73085)
 Cognin (73087)
 Coise-Saint-Jean-Pied-Gauthier (73089)
 La Compôte (73090)
 Conjux (73091)
 Corbel (73092)
 La Croix-de-la-Rochette (73095)
 Cruet (73096)
 Curienne (73097)
 Les Déserts (73098)
 Détrier (73099)
 Domessin (73100)
 Doucy-en-Bauges (73101)
 Drumettaz-Clarafond (73103)
 Dullin (73104)
 Les Échelles (73105)
 École (73106)
 Entrelacs (73010)
 Entremont-le-Vieux (73107)
 Fréterive (73120)
 Gerbaix (73122)
 Grésy-sur-Aix (73128)
 Hauteville (73133)
 Jacob-Bellecombette (73137)
 Jarsy (73139)
 Jongieux (73140)
 Laissaud (73141)
 Lépin-le-Lac (73145)
 Lescheraines (73146)
 Loisieux (73147)
 Lucey (73149)
 Marcieux (73152)
 Méry (73155)
 Meyrieux-Trouet (73156)
 Les Mollettes (73159)
 Montagnole (73160)
 Montcel (73164)
 Montendry (73166)
 Montmélian (73171)
 La Motte-en-Bauges (73178)
 La Motte-Servolex (73179)
 Motz (73180)
 Mouxy (73182)
 Myans (73183)
 Nances (73184)
 Novalaise (73191)
 Le Noyer (73192)
 Ontex (73193)
 Planaise (73200)
 Le Pont-de-Beauvoisin (73204)
 Le Pontet (73205)
 Porte-de-Savoie (73151)
 Presle (73207)
 Pugny-Chatenod (73208)
 Puygros (73210)
 La Ravoire (73213)
 Rochefort (73214)
 Rotherens (73217)
 Ruffieux (73218)
 Saint-Alban-Leysse (73222)
 Saint-Alban-de-Montbel (73219)
 Saint-Baldoph (73225)
 Saint-Béron (73226)
 Saint-Cassin (73228)
 Saint-Christophe (73229)
 Sainte-Hélène-du-Lac (73240)
 Sainte-Marie-d'Alvey (73254)
 Sainte-Reine (73277)
 Saint-Franc (73233)
 Saint-François-de-Sales (73234)
 Saint-Genix-les-Villages (73236)
 Saint-Jean-d'Arvey (73243)
 Saint-Jean-de-Chevelu (73245)
 Saint-Jean-de-Couz (73246)
 Saint-Jean-de-la-Porte (73247)
 Saint-Jeoire-Prieuré (73249)
 Saint-Offenge (73263)
 Saint-Ours (73265)
 Saint-Paul (73269)
 Saint-Pierre-d'Albigny (73270)
 Saint-Pierre-d'Alvey (73271)
 Saint-Pierre-d'Entremont (73274)
 Saint-Pierre-de-Curtille (73273)
 Saint-Pierre-de-Genebroz (73275)
 Saint-Pierre-de-Soucy (73276)
 Saint-Sulpice (73281)
 Saint-Thibaud-de-Couz (73282)
 Serrières-en-Chautagne (73286)
 Sonnaz (73288)
 La Table (73289)
 Thoiry (73293)
 La Thuile (73294)
 Traize (73299)
 Tresserve (73300)
 Trévignin (73301)
 La Trinité (73302)
 Valgelon-La Rochette (73215)
 Verel-de-Montbel (73309)
 Verel-Pragondran (73310)
 Le Verneil (73311)
 Verthemex (73313)
 Villard-d'Héry (73314)
 Villard-Léger (73315)
 Villard-Sallet (73316)
 Villaroux (73324)
 Vimines (73326)
 Vions (73327)
 Viviers-du-Lac (73328)
 Voglans (73329)
 Yenne (73330)

History

The arrondissement of Chambéry was created in 1860.

As a result of the reorganisation of the cantons of France which came into effect in 2015, the borders of the cantons are no longer related to the borders of the arrondissements. The cantons of the arrondissement of Chambéry were, as of January 2015:

 Aix-les-Bains-Centre
 Aix-les-Bains-Nord-Grésy
 Aix-les-Bains-Sud
 Albens
 Chambéry-Est
 Chambéry-Nord
 Chambéry-Sud
 Chambéry-Sud-Ouest
 Chamoux-sur-Gelon
 Le Châtelard
 Cognin
 Les Échelles
 Montmélian
 La Motte-Servolex
 Le Pont-de-Beauvoisin
 La Ravoire
 La Rochette
 Ruffieux
 Saint-Alban-Leysse
 Saint-Genix-sur-Guiers
 Saint-Pierre-d'Albigny
 Yenne

References

Chambery
Chambéry